Honorine Bell is an American actress.

Career
Bell has been in movies such as Ghost World, The Terminal, Bring It On, Road Trip, Baja Beach Bums, and Jarhead. She had a recurring role on Gilmore Girls playing Lulu, a local third grade teacher at the Stars Hollow Elementary School and girlfriend to Kirk Gleason.

She has also done voice acting, being in the PSP game Jeanne d'Arc. She also voiced roles in four episodes of the animated television series King of the Hill.

Filmography

Film

Television

Video Games

References

External links

TV guide celebrity profile

Living people
American voice actresses
American television actresses
American film actresses
20th-century American actresses
21st-century American actresses
Year of birth missing (living people)